"One in a Million" is third single from singer/songwriter Ne-Yo's fourth studio album Libra Scale. In the UK, the song was released as the second single from the album. The song was released on September 14, 2010. "One in a Million" was written by Ne-Yo and Chuck Harmony and produced by Harmony. It reached number 87 on the Billboard Hot 100.

Music video
Wayne Isham directed video for "One in a Million" premiered on September 3, 2010. The full-length nine-minute video is included on the deluxe edition DVD version of the Libra Scale album.

For continuity, Jerome (Ne-Yo) remembers back to when he first met Pretti Sinclair (Galen Hooks). The video is influenced by Michael Jackson's "The Way You Make Me Feel", where he follows a woman to following her down the street and showing off his dance moves. Ne-Yo, Clyde and Leroy were at a café, and as soon as Sinclair's friends saw the Gentlemen trio, they immediately joined their table, leaving Sinclair behind. Jerome then tries to draw his attention towards her by floating his drink, Sinclair then advises the waiter to take away the drink and give it to Jerome.He walked up to her, trying to make a conversation. Sinclair, however, thought that Jerome was simply an arrogant man who always tries to get what he wants, and didn't want to befriend him. Jerome then told Clyde and Leroy to get up and do "THE THANG", which was dancing to One in a Million to impress Sinclair. During the bridge, however, Sinclair got angry seeing Jerome dancing with other girls, and left. As the dance finished, Jerome ran off to find Sinclair. After having stopped a cab to get Sinclair, Jerome persuaded her into going out on a dinner date to prove her wrong. The video ends.

Track listing
"One in a Million" – 4:04

Personnel
Songwriting – Shaffer Smith, Chuck Harmony, K.E. on the Track
Production – Chuck Harmony
Recording – Mike "TrakGuru" Johnson & Jaymz Hardy-Martin III
Mixing – Jaymz Hardy-Martin III
Mixing assistant – Jerel Lake
Vocals – Ne-Yo

Source:

Charts
"One in a Million" became Ne-Yo's eighth top 20 hit as a lead artist and his second consecutive top 20 hit from Libra Scale in the UK. The song entered and peaked at number 20 on the UK Singles Chart and number 4 on the UK R&B Singles Chart on 7 November 2010. It also debuted at number 97 on the Billboard Hot 100 and reached number 87 in its fifth week. The song is Platinum in Italy.

Weekly charts

Year-end charts

Certifications

Release history

Radio adds

Purchaseable release

References

2010 singles
2010 songs
Ne-Yo songs
Music videos directed by Wayne Isham
Song recordings produced by Chuck Harmony
Songs written by Chuck Harmony
Songs written by Ne-Yo
Def Jam Recordings singles
Songs written by K.E. on the Track